Belgutei ( – ) was the son of Yesugei and Sochigel and half-brother to Genghis Khan. He also became general to Genghis Khan. Belgutei was considered a wise counselor and skilled diplomat, and was often used as a messenger by Genghis Khan. With Genghis Khan's blessing, Belgutei killed the champion wrestler of the Mongols, Buri Boko, by breaking his neck during a wrestling match. This was revenge for an earlier incident when Buri Boko had fought with Belgutei and slashed him with a sword. According to legend, Belgutei lived to an unusually old age. Rashid ad-Din claims he died at the age of 110, while the Yuanshi reports that he was still alive when Möngke Khan took the throne in 1251, making him around 90, which would make him one of the oldest men on the earth at the time.

Ancestry

References

1160s births
1271 deaths
Genghis Khan